Uğur Ümit Üngör (born in Erzincan, 1980) is a Dutch–Turkish academic, historian, sociologist, and professor of Genocide studies, specializing as a scholar and researcher of Holocaust studies and studies on mass violence. He served as Professor of History at the Utrecht University and Professor of Sociology at the NIOD Institute for War, Holocaust and Genocide Studies.

Biography

Studies and career
Üngör, who was born in Erzincan, Turkey and raised in Enschede, the Netherlands, earned a doctorate from the University of Amsterdam in 2009, and taught history at the Utrecht University and sociology at the NIOD Institute for War, Holocaust and Genocide Studies in Amsterdam. Üngör was Lecturer in International History at the University of Sheffield 2008–2009, then Postdoctoral Research Fellow at the Centre for War Studies at the University College Dublin in 2009–2010. Since February 2020, he has been Professor of Holocaust and Genocide Studies at the NIOD Institute for War, Holocaust and Genocide Studies in Amsterdam.

He has published widely in the field of mass violence and genocide studies, in particular the late Ottoman genocides, the Armenian genocide, and the Rwandan genocide. Üngör's book based on his dissertation, The Making of Modern Turkey: Nation and State in Eastern Anatolia, 1913-50 (Oxford University Press, 2011), was the winner of the Erasmus Prize by the Praemium Erasmianum Foundation in 2010, and of the Keetje Hodshon Prize awarded by the Royal Holland Society of Sciences and Humanities in 2013. In 2012, Üngör was awarded the Heineken Young Scientist Award in History by the Royal Dutch Academy of Sciences.

He and Armenian Alexander Goekjian, who also wrote the screenplay and directed, are featured in the documentary The Land of Our Grandparents, which was shown on Dutch public television on 24 April 2008, and was awarded the prize for best documentary at the Pomegranate Film Festival in Toronto  that year. Üngör also co-wrote Confiscation and Destruction: The Young Turk Seizure of Armenian Property in 2011. His most recent work, De Syrische Goelag: Assads Gevangenissen, 1970–2020, was published in 2022 and focused on the dynamics of paramilitary violence in the Syrian civil war, notably on the Tadamon massacre.

Works

Articles

Essays

References

External links
 Ugur Ümit Üngör official website
 Üngör's profile on the NIOD Institute website
 "Fatale mix voor massageweld". Interview by Mariette Huisjes, Akademie Nieuws, Royal Dutch Academy of Sciences 

1980 births
20th-century Dutch educators
20th-century Dutch historians
20th-century Turkish historians
21st-century Dutch educators
21st-century Dutch historians
21st-century Turkish historians
Academics of the University of Sheffield
Academics of University College Dublin
Dutch expatriates in Ireland
Dutch expatriates in the United Kingdom
Genocide education
Genocide studies scholars
Historians of genocides
Historians of the Armenian genocide
Historians of the Holocaust
Members of the Koninklijke Hollandsche Maatschappij der Wetenschappen
Living people
People from Enschede
People from Erzincan
Scholars of Ottoman history
Turkish emigrants to the Netherlands
Turkish expatriates in Ireland
Turkish expatriates in the United Kingdom
University of Amsterdam alumni
Academic staff of Utrecht University